The  (SFADB) is an index of science fiction, fantasy, and horror awards compiled by Mark R. Kelly and published by the Locus Science Fiction Foundation. Known formerly as the Locus Index to SF Awards, it has been cited as an invaluable science fiction resource, and is often more up-to-date than the awards' own websites (according to The Encyclopedia of Science Fiction).

History 

The Locus Index to Science Fiction Awards was established in 2000 by Mark R. Kelly, the founder of Locus Online. The Cornell University Library has described it as a comprehensive listing of science fiction awards, including "reader polls, fan awards, inactive awards, academic awards, award statistics, and more". Despite the title, the index has always covered fantasy and horror in addition to science fiction. In 2012, coincident with Kelly's retirement as an aerospace software engineer, the website received a redesign and expansion, and was renamed the Science Fiction Awards Database (SFADB).

Reception 

The index has received praise from authors and editors of speculative fiction, including Jo Walton and Gardner Dozois. Walton has said that her book An Informal History of the Hugos would not have been possible without the existence of the index. The Orion Publishing Group called it "extraordinary, and to our mind, criminally under-appreciated", and cited it as a primary source for Gollancz's SF Masterworks and SF Gateway series of books.

Writing in The Encyclopedia of Science Fiction, Peter Nicholls and David Langford called the index invaluable, and noted that it was often more up-to-date than the awards' official websites. Locus Online, which hosted the index, received the 2002 Hugo Award for Best Website.

Contents 

The SFADB compiles over 100 literary awards for science fiction, fantasy, and horror, from 1951 to date. It includes both nominees and winners, with a separate page for each person and award. Awards are displayed as three groups: Major Career Awards, Major Awards and Other Awards, and can be sorted chronologically, by nominee, and by category.

Statistics such as "Total Wins", "Total Losses" and "Never-Winners" are also listed. The following table lists a subset of 29 awards that are featured in the "Awards" dropdown (as of 2021):

The SFADB also has a citations directory for each author, containing a list of critical works and reading guides where their books have been cited. In 2018, it added indexes for "Year's Best" anthologies of short fiction, with contents linked to the individual author pages.

References

Sources

External links 
 Locus Index to Science Fiction Awards (archive)
 Science Fiction Awards Database

Bibliographic databases and indexes
Library 2.0
Online databases
Speculative fiction websites
Internet properties established in 2000
Science fiction awards
Fantasy awards
Horror fiction awards